Gardner is an unincorporated community in Mercer County, West Virginia, United States. The Gardner Area was home of the Bluestone Land and Lumber Company, the Mercer County Poor Farm, and the Forestry Sciences Laboratory. Organizations that still exist in the Gardner Area include the Mercer County Gardner Center, U.S. Forest Service, West Virginia Forest Products Center, West Virginia Division of Highways, Pikeview Middle School and Pikeview High School.

References

Unincorporated communities in Mercer County, West Virginia
Unincorporated communities in West Virginia